Lembit Küüts (born 18 October 1946 Tallinn) is an Estonian artist and politician. He was a member of VII Riigikogu.

References

Living people
1946 births
20th-century Estonian male artists
21st-century Estonian male artists
Members of the Riigikogu, 1992–1995
Artists from Tallinn
Politicians from Tallinn